Steven Edward Gaughan (born 14 April 1970) is an English former footballer who played as a midfielder for various clubs in the Football League. Whilst at Chesterfield he featured in their memorable run to the 1997 FA Cup semi finals, coming on as a substitute in their quarter final victory over Wrexham. However, he did not play in the semi final itself, as Chesterfield ultimately lost to Middlesbrough after a replay.

References

External links

1970 births
Living people
Footballers from Doncaster
English footballers
Association football midfielders
Hatfield Main F.C. players
Doncaster Rovers F.C. players
Sunderland A.F.C. players
Darlington F.C. players
Chesterfield F.C. players
Halifax Town A.F.C. players
Cork City F.C. players
Barrow A.F.C. players
Armthorpe Welfare F.C. players
Stocksbridge Park Steels F.C. players
English Football League players
Expatriate association footballers in the Republic of Ireland
League of Ireland players